Adrià Granell Artal (born 13 March 1986 in Valencia) is a Spanish footballer who plays for Atlético Saguntino as a left winger.

External links

Stats at FutbolEsta 

1986 births
Living people
Spanish footballers
Footballers from Valencia (city)
Association football wingers
Segunda División players
Segunda División B players
Tercera División players
Villarreal CF C players
Real Zaragoza B players
Real Zaragoza players
CD Alcoyano footballers
Albacete Balompié players
Huracán Valencia CF players
Hércules CF players
CD Olímpic de Xàtiva footballers
CD Guijuelo footballers
Atlético Saguntino players